A49 may refer to :
 A49 road (England), a road connecting Ross-on-Wye and Bamber Bridge
 A49 autoroute, a road connecting Grenoble and Valence, France
 King's Indian Defence, Encyclopaedia of Chess Openings code

A-49 may refer to :
 Autovía A-49, a major highway in Andalucia, Spain

A 49 may refer to:
 Bundesautobahn 49, Germany